Stanhope Elmore High School is a grades 9–12 school in Millbrook, Alabama, United States. As part of the Elmore County Public School System, the school is the Home of the Mustangs, Foshee-Henderson Stadium, and the Pride of Millbrook Marching Band.

History
Stanhope Elmore High School was founded in 1965 and is named after former Alabama Secretary of State Albert Stanhope Elmore (1827–1909). It currently has five main buildings for classrooms, an "agriscience" shop, a distance learning room, and a combination facility containing a gymnasium, cafeteria, band room, and a room for band percussionists and color guard

Enrollment
As of 2015, enrollment was 1,087 students. Enrollment demographics are 50.4% White, 41.3% Black, 4.3% Hispanic, 1.9% two or more races, 1.5% Asian, 0.4% Native American, and 0.2% Pacific Islander. The student-teacher ratio is 18:1. As 1 of only 4 public high schools in the Elmore County Public School System, the school draws students from the city of Millbrook and the towns of Coosada, Deatsville, and Elmore.

Academics
As of 2007, Stanhope Elmore has 62 certified teachers, three administrators, and two guidance counselors.
The school supports advanced or standard "diplomas", and has AP programs in history, English, and mathematics. Stanhope Elmore also participates in the statewide ACCESS distance learning program. The school has made AYP for the past four years in a row.

Athletics

Football

Stanhope Elmore's football team is the Stanhope Elmore Mustangs. The first coach was Conrad Henderson. After  the retirement of Henderson in 1973, the school hired Robert Butterworth. Butterworth resigned in 1975, the school then selected Jimmy Foshee as head coach and athletic director. Foshee never had a losing season and went to the semifinals 4 times. In 1994 the stadium formerly known as Conrad Henderson Stadium got a new name: Foshee- Henderson Stadium. Foshee retired in 2000 his record was: 212-81-1, also in 2000 he was selected into the AHSAA hall of fame. Foshee's successor was his youngest son Jeff. Jeff Foshee was a player on the 1992 Alabama Crimson Tide National Championship team.  The Mustangs in 2005 moved from 5a to 6a classifications. In 2012 Jeff won his 100th game. Foshee soon resigned after a reported academic scandal with another teacher in summer of 2016. The current head coach is former Mustangs wide receiver Brian Bradford. The Mustangs top rivals are Prattville High School and Wetumpka High School.

Baseball

Stanhope Elmore won its first state title in 2006. Hank Furlow was the Head Coach and retired after the season.

Extracurricular
The school hosts many thriving creativity clubs, such as the Book Club and the Creative Writing Club, as well as many career-oriented clubs, like the Future Farmers of America, FFA, DECA, FCCLA, and Youth in Government.

There are also a few community outreach programs: Key Club, Mustang Ambassadors, Diamond Dolls, and a Bridge Builders program.

Alma Mater
by Eunice Stubblefield
Proudly she stands
Noble and grand,
Through her portals pass
The future of our land,
Her loyalty is true
May it ever be for you,
Your loyal sons stand by
Hail! Stanhope Elmore High!

Social/academic
Mu Alpha Theta
Spanish Club
Science Club
Robotics Team
Outdoor Club
National Honors Society
Standard Club\
Future Business Leaders of America

Notable alumni
 Austin Adams, baseball player
 Shannon Brown, basketball/football player
 Robert Chancey, former football player
 Patrick Dopson, gospel artist
 Terrence Long, former baseball player
 Dee Milliner, football player
 Antowain Smith, former football player
 William C. Thompson, Presiding Judge, Alabama Court of Civil Appeals
 Aaron Traywick, biohacker

References

External links

 The Stanhope Elmore High School official website
 Albert Stanhope Elmore epitaph

Public high schools in Alabama
Educational institutions established in 1965
Schools in Elmore County, Alabama
1965 establishments in Alabama